The 1879 Cockermouth by-election was fought on 16 April 1879.  The by-election took place due to the death of the incumbent Liberal MP, Isaac Fletcher.  It was won by the Liberal candidate William Fletcher.

References

1879 elections in the United Kingdom
1879 in England
19th century in Cumberland
By-elections to the Parliament of the United Kingdom in Cumbria constituencies